116 (one hundred [and] sixteen) is the natural number following 115 and preceding 117.

In mathematics
116 is a noncototient, meaning that there is no solution to the equation , where  stands for Euler's totient function.

116! + 1 is a factorial prime.

There are 116 ternary Lyndon words of length six, and 116 irreducible polynomials of degree six over a three-element field, which form the basis of a free Lie algebra of dimension 116.

There are 116 different ways of partitioning the numbers from 1 through 5 into subsets in such a way that, for every k, the union of the first k subsets is a consecutive sequence of integers.

There are 116 different 6×6 Costas arrays.

See also
116 (disambiguation)

References

Integers